La Vale Tollgate House is a historic toll house in La Vale, Allegany County, Maryland, United States. It is a two-story brick structure built in 1835–1836, with seven sides—a basic polygon plan. A one-story Tuscan-columned porch extends around the five outer sides of the polygonal portion. On top is a non-functional reconstructed cupola. The building served as a toll house on the Cumberland or National Road and was the first such structure to be erected.

La Vale Tollgate House was listed on the National Register of Historic Places in 1971.

References

External links

, including photo in 1996, at Maryland Historical Trust
 Historical Marker Data Base listing for La Vale Tollgate House
 Waymarking listing for La Vale Tollgate House

Transportation buildings and structures on the National Register of Historic Places in Maryland
Houses completed in 1836
Transport infrastructure completed in 1836
Transportation buildings and structures in Allegany County, Maryland
National Register of Historic Places in Allegany County, Maryland
Toll houses on the National Register of Historic Places